Edward Fox (June 10, 1815 – December 14, 1881) was a United States district judge of the United States District Court for the District of Maine.

Education and career

Born in Portland, Maine, Fox graduated from Harvard University in 1834, and from Harvard Law School in 1837. He practiced in Portland, and in Cincinnati, Ohio, and was city solicitor for Portland. He was the county attorney of Cumberland County, Maine. He worked with Neal Dow to draft a prohibition law, which became known as the Maine Law after the state legislature approved it in 1851. Dow claimed credit for authoring the law, but his cousin John Neal revealed Fox's contribution in the press. That contribution was the search and seizure provision, which created a new legal standard for obtaining search warrants and contributed toward to the modern probable cause standard. A decade later he was an associate justice of the Maine Supreme Court from 1862 to 1863.

Federal judicial service

On May 28, 1866, Fox was nominated by President Andrew Johnson to a seat on the United States District Court for the District of Maine vacated by Judge Ashur Ware. Fox was confirmed by the United States Senate on May 30, 1866, and received his commission the next day. Fox served in this position until his death in Portland on December 14, 1881.

References

Sources
 

Daniel Goodenow

1815 births
1881 deaths
Justices of the Maine Supreme Judicial Court
Judges of the United States District Court for the District of Maine
United States federal judges appointed by Andrew Johnson
19th-century American judges
Lawyers from Portland, Maine
Harvard Law School alumni
Harvard College alumni